East New York is an American police procedural television series that premiered on CBS on October 2, 2022. The series stars Amanda Warren, Jimmy Smits, Ruben Santiago-Hudson, Kevin Rankin, Richard Kind, and Elizabeth Rodriguez.

Premise 
The series centers on the officers and detectives  of the NYPD’s 74th precinct in the Brooklyn neighborhood of East New York. Heading up the precinct is Deputy Inspector Regina Haywood, the newly promoted commanding officer. Haywood has a vision that not only will they serve and protect the community but become a part of it.

Cast and characters

Main
 Amanda Warren as Deputy Inspector Regina Haywood
 Kevin Rankin as Detective First Grade Tommy Killian
 Richard Kind as Captain Stan Yenko
 Elizabeth Rodriguez as Detective Second Grade Crystal Morales
 Olivia Luccardi as Officer Brandy Quinlan
 Lavel Schley as Officer Andre Bentley
 Ruben Santiago-Hudson as Officer Marvin Sandeford
 Jimmy Smits as Assistant Chief John Suarez

Recurring 
 C. S. Lee as Desk Sergeant Jimmy Kee
 Ben Michael Brown as Officer Matthew Lyle
 Darien Sills-Evans as New York City Deputy Mayor Raymond Sharpe
 Caitlin Mehner as Corrine Moynahan
 Stephen Plunkett as Detective First Grade Desmond Troy
 Max Gordon Moore as ADA Seth Tolchin
 Donovan Christie Jr. as Sean Dryden
 Kelly Hu as Allison Cha

Guest 
 Malik Yoba as Lamonte Jacobs
 Lauren Velez as Tamika Martin
 Lee Tergesen as US Marshall David Westlake
 Paul Calderon as Father Frank
 Ron Canada as Maurice Haywood
 Gemma McIlhenny as Officer Carrie Hawkins
 Nelson Avidon as Don Jankowicz
 Phil John as Stuffy

Episodes

Production 
On May 12, 2022, CBS picked up the series. On October 19, 2022, the series received a full season order. On October 24, 2022, it was reported that executive producers Christine Holder and Mark Holder were to exit the series.

Broadcast 
East New York premiered on CBS on October 2, 2022. It airs on Sundays at 9:00 PM after The Equalizer and lead into NCIS: Los Angeles. In Canada, it airs on CTV Television Network. In Australia it premiered on Foxtel and Binge On October 3, 2022.

Reception

Critical response 
The review aggregator website Rotten Tomatoes reported an 88% approval rating with an average rating of 7.6/10, based on 8 critic reviews. Metacritic, which uses a weighted average, assigned a score of 68 out of 100 based on 5 critics, indicating "generally favorable reviews".

Ratings

Notes

References

External links 
 
 

2020s American crime drama television series
2020s American police procedural television series
2022 American television series debuts
CBS original programming
English-language television shows
East New York, Brooklyn
Fictional portrayals of the New York City Police Department
Television series by Warner Bros. Television Studios
Television shows set in Brooklyn